Hornblendite is a plutonic rock consisting mainly of the amphibole hornblende. Hornblende-rich ultramafic rocks are rare and when hornblende is the dominant mineral phase they are classified as hornblendites with qualifiers such as garnet hornblendite identifying a second abundant contained mineral.

Metamorphic rocks composed dominantly of amphiboles are referred to as amphibolites.

References
 Blatt, Harvey and Robert J. Tracy (1996) Petrology, Freeman, p. 72, 

Igneous petrology
Plutonic rocks